"A Woman Like You" is a single by Canadian country music artist Johnny Reid. It was recorded on his 2009 album Dance with Me, reaching a peak of #51 on the Canadian Hot 100.

Chart performance

Certifications

Cover versions 
Danis Mallais (auteur-compositeur-interprète Canada) from his album Authentique (2017)

Al Copegog 2013 youtube https://www.youtube.com/watch?v=WVJx5T3cEZ4

References

2009 singles
Johnny Reid songs
Open Road Recordings singles
Songs written by Brent Maher
Song recordings produced by Brent Maher
2009 songs
Canadian Country Music Association Songwriter(s) of the Year winners
Songs written by Johnny Reid